The Public Investment Fund (PIF) Tower (previously known as Capital Market Authority Tower) is a  skyscraper in Riyadh, Saudi Arabia. Construction started in 2010 and was topped-out in 2014. The building was finally completed in 2021, making it the tallest building in Riyadh, surpassing Burj Rafal, and the second-tallest in Saudi Arabia. Designed by HOK and Omrania, the 76-story PIF Tower is one of the most high-tech skyscrapers in the world and the centerpiece of the King Abdullah Financial District.

The tower is aiming for LEED Gold certification and will feature an observation deck, two-story atrium as well as double-height sky lobbies, an innovative Twin elevator system with two cabs traveling in a single shaft, and amenities including a fitness center, pool, and cafeteria.

References

External links
Picture of the tower

Skyscrapers in Riyadh